Ed Whitmore is a British screenwriter. He has written for a number of successful British TV series such as Waking the Dead and Silent Witness. Whitmore is an alumnus of Westfield College.

Career
In 2003 he wrote the Waking The Dead episode "Multistorey", directed by Robert Bierman, which won the show an Emmy for Best International Drama Series.  He adapted the book Hallam Foe into a successful film, for which he was subsequently nominated at the Moët et Chandon British Independent Film Awards (BIFAs) for Best Screenplay, losing to Patrick Marber's Notes on a Scandal, as well as the BAFTA-winning Sea of Souls, for which he won the Edgar Allan Poe Award for Best Episode in a TV Series. He created and wrote ITV drama Identity, which was aired on British TV in the summer of 2010; the remake rights were then sold to the ABC Network in America.

He later wrote episodes of CSI and Strike Back, as well as the miniseries Arthur & George and Rillington Place. He wrote and created the ITV drama Manhunt first shown in the United Kingdom on 6 January 2019, airing on three consecutive nights. Consolidated figures show an average of 8.7 million viewers across the three episodes, rising further to 9 million viewers when online viewing is included. This made the series ITV's highest rated launch of a new drama series since the first series of Broadchurch in 2013. Whitmore's work on Manhunt earned him a nomination for the Mystery Writers of America 2020 Edgar Award for Best Television Episode Teleplay.

References

External links

Living people
People educated at Ardingly College
Alumni of Westfield College
British television writers
English screenwriters
English male screenwriters
English television writers
British male television writers
Year of birth missing (living people)